Coolaney is a village in County Sligo, Ireland. Coolaney sits at the foot of the Ox Mountains with the river Owen Beg running through it around which is a walk. The remains of an old mill are located along the riverside walk, and the remains of the sluices under the mill can still be clearly seen, as well as the outfalls into the nearby river.

Amenities
As of the 2016 census, Coolaney had a population of just under 1,000 people, a significant increase in the ten years since the 2006 census, when the village had a population of just over 200 people.

Coolaney's Roman Catholic parish church is located in Rockfield, approximately 800 m from the village centre. Across from St. Joseph's Church is the national (primary) school, Rockfield National School. The village also has memorials to the 1916 Rising and to a local man who died during the Irish Civil War.

An old railway line, no longer in use, runs through the village. Mullagh Lough, to the northwest of Coolaney village, is used for fishing.

There is a riparian walk in Coolaney. It won the "Tidiest town in Sligo" title over 12 times. Coolaney Tidy Towns Committee was founded in 1969.

Protected structures in the area, as listed by Sligo County Council, include Leyny Station, Coolaney Bridge and Rockfield Roman Catholic Church.

Coolaney and nearby village Mullinabreena are a combined Gaelic football team.

Gallery

See also

 List of towns and villages in Ireland

References

Towns and villages in County Sligo